Henry Hill (April 7, 1843 – August 2, 1908) was a soldier in the United States Army during the American Civil War. He received the Medal of Honor.

Biography
Hill was born on April 17, 1843 in Schuylkill County, Pennsylvania.

On May 6, 1864, as a Corporal of Company C, 50th Pennsylvania Volunteer Infantry during the Battle of the Wilderness, Hill "refused to retreat and instead advanced inspiring his men and the regiment to recapture their position.

Hill died on August 2, 1908, and was buried in Greenwood Cemetery, in Boonton, New Jersey.

Medal of Honor citation
Rank and organization: Corporal, Company C, 50th Pennsylvania Infantry. Place and date: At  Wilderness, Va., 6 May 1864.

Citation:

This soldier, with one companion, would not retire when his regiment fell back in confusion after an unsuccessful charge, but instead advanced and continued firing upon the enemy until the regiment re-formed and regained its position.

See also
 List of Medal of Honor recipients
 List of American Civil War Medal of Honor recipients: G–L

Notes

References

External links
 

1843 births
1908 deaths
United States Army Medal of Honor recipients
People of Pennsylvania in the American Civil War
American Civil War recipients of the Medal of Honor